Henry James Hatch (April 28, 1869 – December 31, 1931) was a United States Army officer in the late 19th and early 20th centuries. He served in World War I and received the Distinguished Service Medal among other awards.

Biography
Hatch was born in Charlotteville, Michigan, on April 28, 1869. He graduated from the University of Michigan in 1891 with a B.S. in engineering. His father was president of the Arkansas City National Bank of Arkansas City, Kansas, and Hatch was the bank's cashier from 1891 to 1897.

Hatch was commissioned as a second lieutenant of the Artillery Corps on July 9, 1898, and he graduated from the artillery school. He rose through the ranks, becoming a colonel on February 6, 1918, and he was promoted to the rank of brigadier general on June 26, 1918. He served as the chief of the Heavy Artillery section of the staff of the American Expeditionary Forces' Chief of Artillery, and from 1918 to 1919, he commanded the Railway Artillery of the Second Army.

Hatch reverted to his permanent rank of colonel on July 1, 1920, serving in the Coast Artillery. He was promoted again to brigadier general on September 5, 1917, with the promotion being permanent this time. later in his career, he commanded Los Angeles's coastal defenses, commanded the harbor defenses of Subic Bay and Manila Bay, and commanded the Second Coast Artillery District. He received the Distinguished Service Medal, and France awarded him the Legion of Honour.

Hatch died in Washington, D.C., where he lived, on December 31, 1931.

Personal life
Hatch married Alice E. Hill on June 26, 1893, and they had two children together.

References

Bibliography

1869 births
1931 deaths
People from Berrien County, Michigan
People from Washington, D.C.
University of Michigan College of Engineering alumni
Recipients of the Distinguished Service Medal (US Army)
Officiers of the Légion d'honneur
United States Army generals of World War I
United States Army generals
Military personnel from Michigan